Khiddirpur is a village. Gram Panchayat in Bikapur Tehsil, Ayodhya district (previously known as Faizabad district) in the state of Uttar Pradesh, India. Khiddirpur is 43km south of the district headquarters Ayodhya city. The population was 1100 as of the 2001 Census of India.

Education
There are many schools and colleges in Chaure Bazar, Ayodhya including:
 Government Primary School, Bharahu Khatta, Chaure Bazar, Ayodhya.
 Triloki Nath Inter College, Chaure Bazar, Ayodhya.
 BGN Inter College, Manchha Sonaura, Chaure Bazar, Ayodhya.
 Kasturba Gandhi School, Chaure Bazar, Ayodhya.

Demographics
 2001 Census of India, Khiddirpur had a population of 1100, with males constituting 51% of the population and females 49%. Khiddirpur has an average literacy rate of 60%, compared to the national average of 59.5%; with 58% of males and 42% of females literate. 18% of the population is under 6 years of age.

Transport

Rail
Khiddirpur is situated near NH-330 Ayodhya-Sultanpur highway, and Chaure Bazar railway station is the nearest railway station. 

Other railway stations close to Khiddipur include:

 Bharat Kund railway station 
 Ayodhya Cantt Jn 
 Ayodhya Junction 
 Kurebhar Station 
 Sultanpur Junction

Air
Ayodhya Airport is the nearest airport to Khiddirpur, Ayodhya.

Road
Khiddirpur is well connected with nearby cities Faizabad, Ayodhya and Sultanpur. Chaure Bazar, Kurebhar, Haiderganj, Tarun, and Bikapur are nearby towns that are well connected to Khiddirpur.

References

Villages in Faizabad district